Behind the Scene is the sixth studio album by American country music artist Reba McEntire, released on August 15, 1983. It includes the singles "Why Do We Want (What We Know We Can't Have)", which was a top ten hit and "There Ain't No Future in This". It was her last album for Mercury Records before leaving for MCA Nashville in 1984. McEntire felt the need for change in record labels at the time as an opportunity to gain more independence in the material she recorded.

Track listing

Personnel 
 Reba McEntire – lead and backing vocals
 David Briggs – keyboards
 David John Boyle – guitars
 Ray Edenton – guitars, banjo, mandolin
 Dale Sellers – guitars
 Pete Wade – guitars
 Chip Young – guitars
 Bobby Thompson – banjo
 Weldon Myrick – steel guitar
 Billy Puett – fiddle
 Buddy Spicher – fiddle
 Mike Leech – bass guitar 
 Jerry Carrigan – drums, percussion
 Gene Chrisman – drums, percussion
 Bergen White – alto flute, flute
 Yvonne Hodges – backing vocals
 Dorris King – backing vocals
 Trish Williams – backing vocals

The Nashville String Machine
 Carl Gorodetzky – string arrangements
 Bergen White – string arrangements
 George Binkley III, Marvin Chantry, Roy Christensen, Mark Feldman, Daniel Furth, Lennie Haight, Phyllis Hiltz, Dennis Molchan, Walter Schwede, Gary Vanosdale and Pamela Vanosdale – string performers

Production 
 Jerry Kennedy – producer
 Lee Groitzsch – engineer, mixing 
 Brent King – assistant engineer
 Tim Kish – assistant engineer
 Hank Williams – mastering
 Bill Barnes – art direction, graphics
 Deb Mahalanobis – design 
 Mario Casilli – photography

Charts

Album

Singles

References 

1983 albums
Reba McEntire albums
Mercury Nashville albums
Albums produced by Jerry Kennedy